92 may refer to: 
 92 (number)
 one of the years 92 BC, AD 92, 1992, 2092, etc.
 Atomic number 92: uranium
 Beretta 92
 Saab 92
 "92" (song) a Serbian-language song by Elena Risteska

See also
 
 List of highways numbered